DeWitt High School is a public high school in the city of DeWitt, Michigan, United States. It is managed by the DeWitt Public Schools district.

References

Schools in Clinton County, Michigan
Public high schools in Michigan